Andressa Picussa (born ) is a Brazilian female volleyball player. She was part of the Brazil women's national volleyball team. Her hometown is Rio de Janeiro.

She participated in the 2012 FIVB Volleyball World Grand Prix.
She plays for the Minas Tênis Clube.

Clubs
  Minas Tênis Clube (2007–2009)
  Mackenzie EC (2009–2010)
  Vôlei Futuro (2010–2012)
  Vôlei Amil-Campinas (2012–2013)
  Eczacıbaşı VitrA (2013–2014)
  Azeryol Baku (2014–2015)
  São Caetano (2015–2017)
  Vôlei Bauru (2017–)

References

External links
 Profile at FIVB.org

1989 births
Living people
Brazilian women's volleyball players
Place of birth missing (living people)
Sportspeople from Curitiba